Jeff Bucknum (born July 12, 1966, in Glendale, California) is an American race car driver. Jeff is the son of Formula One and Championship Car racer Ronnie Bucknum.

He competed in four Indy Racing League IndyCar Series races in 2005, including the Indianapolis 500, with a best finish of 10th at Infineon Raceway. He also drove a car in the LMP2 class of the American Le Mans Series where he placed 2nd in series points in 2005.

In 2006, Bucknum teamed up with Ron Hemelgarn for his second Indy 500 appearance, in which he had the honor of being the month's first qualifier, but was involved in a second-lap crash and finished 32nd.  It was announced on July 12, 2006, that Bucknum would drive for the remainder of the IndyCar season for Foyt Enterprises. He finished 3 of the 6 races that he drove for Foyt in 2006 and finished no better than 13th.

Racing record

SCCA National Championship Runoffs

24 Hours of Le Mans results

Complete American Open Wheel Racing results
(key)

IRL IndyCar Series

Indy 500

References

External links
 jeffbucknum.com 

1966 births
24 Hours of Daytona drivers
24 Hours of Le Mans drivers
American Le Mans Series drivers
Indianapolis 500 drivers
IndyCar Series drivers
Living people
Sportspeople from Glendale, California
Racing drivers from California
Indy Pro 2000 Championship drivers
Barber Pro Series drivers
SCCA National Championship Runoffs participants

Dreyer & Reinbold Racing drivers
A. J. Foyt Enterprises drivers